Väyrynen is a surname originating in Finland.

Geographical distribution
As of 2014, 92.3% of all known bearers of the surname Väyrynen were residents of Finland. 

In Finland, the frequency of the surname was higher than national average (1:1,875) in the following regions:
 1. Kainuu  (1:251)
 2. Northern Ostrobothnia (1:581)
 3. North Karelia (1:593)
 4. Lapland (1:1,409)
 5. Northern Savonia (1:1,647)
 6. South Karelia (1:1,856)

People
Notable people with the surname include:
 Mika Väyrynen (born 1981), Finnish footballer
 Mika Väyrynen (accordionist) (born 1967), Finnish accordionist
 Paavo Väyrynen (born 1946), Finnish politician
 Tim Väyrynen (born 1993), Finnish footballer

References

Finnish-language surnames
Surnames of Finnish origin